Another Day is the second studio album by Norwegian singer Lene Marlin. It was released on 24 September 2003 by Virgin Records. The album debuted at number one on the Norwegian Albums Chart, spending 14 weeks on the chart.

Track listing

Charts

References

2003 albums
Lene Marlin albums
Virgin Records albums